The trinomial tree is a lattice-based computational model used in financial mathematics to price options. It was developed by Phelim Boyle in 1986. It is an extension of the binomial options pricing model, and is conceptually similar. It can also be shown that the approach is equivalent to the explicit finite difference method for option pricing. For fixed income and interest rate derivatives see Lattice model (finance)#Interest rate derivatives.

Formula
Under the trinomial method, the underlying stock price is modeled as a recombining tree, where, at each node the price has three possible paths: an up, down and stable or middle path. These values are found by multiplying the value at the current node by the appropriate factor ,  or  where

 (the structure is recombining)

and the corresponding probabilities are: 
 
 
.

In the above formulae:  is the length of time per step in the tree and is simply time to maturity divided by the number of time steps;  is the risk-free interest rate over this maturity;  is the corresponding volatility of the underlying;  is its corresponding dividend yield.

As with the binomial model, these factors and probabilities are specified so as to ensure that the price of the underlying evolves as a martingale, while the moments considering node spacing and probabilities are matched to those of the log-normal distribution (and with increasing accuracy for smaller time-steps).

Once the tree of prices has been calculated, the option price is found at each node largely as for the binomial model, by working backwards from the final nodes to the present node. The difference being that the option value at each non-final node is determined based on the threeas opposed to two later nodes and their corresponding probabilities.

If the length of time-steps  is taken as an exponentially distributed random variable and interpreted as the waiting time between two movements of the stock price then the resulting stochastic process is a birth–death process. The resulting model is soluble and there exist analytic pricing and hedging formulae for various options.

Application
The trinomial model is considered to produce more accurate results than the binomial model when fewer time steps are modelled, and is therefore used when computational speed or resources may be an issue. For vanilla options, as the number of steps increases, the results rapidly converge, and the binomial model is then preferred due to its simpler implementation. For exotic options the trinomial model (or adaptations) is sometimes more stable and accurate, regardless of step-size.

See also
 Binomial options pricing model
 Valuation of options
 Option: Model implementation
 Korn–Kreer–Lenssen model
 Implied trinomial tree

References

External links
Phelim Boyle, 1986. "Option Valuation Using a Three-Jump Process", International Options Journal 3, 7–12.

Paul Clifford et al. 2010. Pricing Options Using Trinomial Trees, University of Warwick
Tero Haahtela, 2010. "Recombining Trinomial Tree for Real Option Valuation with Changing Volatility", Aalto University, Working Paper Series.
 Ralf Korn, Markus Kreer and Mark Lenssen, 1998. "Pricing of european options when the underlying stock price follows a linear birth-death process", Stochastic Models Vol. 14(3), pp 647 – 662
 Peter Hoadley. Trinomial Tree Option Calculator (Tree Visualized)

Mathematical finance
Options (finance)
Models of computation
Trees (data structures)
Financial models